The Philippines competed at the World Games 2017 in Wroclaw, Poland, from 20 July 2017 to 30 July 2017. It was in this edition that the Philippines won its first-ever gold medal; courtesy of cue sports player Carlo Biado.

Competitors

Medalists

Archery

Aya Cojuangco qualified a place in the 2017 World Games by clinching a silver in the women's compound event of the 2017 Asia Cup despite having recently recovered from an injury. In the Round of 32, Cojuangco defeated Amelie Sancenot of France before losing to Cassidy Cox of the United States in the Round of 16.

Individual

Cue sports 

Carlo Biado competed in the nine-ball men's singles event. He reached the final of his event after winning his matches against Joshua Filler of Germany in the round of 16, Mieszko Fortuński of Poland in the quarterfinals, and Naoyuki Ōi of Japan in the quarterfinals.

He won the country's first-ever gold medal in the World Games after defeating Jayson Shaw of Great Britain in the final of the men's nine-ball event. 

Chezka Centeno is the other competitor who lost to Han Yu of China in the bronze medal match of the nine-ball women's singles event.

References 

2017 in Philippine sport
Nations at the 2017 World Games
2017